"What Up?" is a posthumous single by American rapper Pimp C, featuring rapper Drake and former-fellow UGK member Bun B. It is the lead single from Pimp C's first posthumous studio album, and third studio album over all, The Naked Soul of Sweet Jones.

Background
"What Up" is the lead single from the posthumous album by Pimp C. While rapper Drake appears on the song, it is predicted that Pimp C never knew about Drake.

Track listing

References

2010 singles
Pimp C songs
Drake (musician) songs
Bun B songs
Song recordings produced by Boi-1da
Songs released posthumously
2010 songs